Sathrusamhaaram is a 1978 Indian Malayalam film,  directed by J. Sasikumar. The film stars Prem Nazir, Jayan, Adoor Bhasi and Manavalan Joseph in the lead roles. The film has musical score by M. K. Arjunan.

Cast
Prem Nazir
Jayan
Adoor Bhasi
Manavalan Joseph
Sankaradi
Sreelatha Namboothiri
Praveena
Unnimary
Meena

Soundtrack
The music was composed by M. K. Arjunan and the lyrics were written by Pappanamkodu Lakshmanan.

References

External links
 

1978 films
1970s Malayalam-language films
Films directed by J. Sasikumar